The New South Wales Premier's Literary Awards, also known as the NSW Premier's Literary Awards, were first awarded in 1979. They are among the richest literary awards in Australia. Notable prizes include the Christina Stead Prize for Fiction, the Kenneth Slessor Prize for Poetry, and the Douglas Stewart Prize for Non-Fiction.

, the Awards are presented by the NSW Government and administered by the State Library of New South Wales in association with Create NSW, with support of Multicultural NSW and the University of Technology Sydney (UTS). Total prize money in 2019 was up to A$305,000, with eligibility limited to writers, translators and illustrators with Australian citizenship or permanent resident status.

History
The NSW Premier's Literary Awards were established in 1979 by the New South Wales Premier Neville Wran. Commenting on its purpose, Wran said: "We want the arts to take, and be seen to take, their proper place in our social priorities. If governments treat writers and artists with respect and understanding, the community will be more likely to do the same." They were the first set of premier's awards offered in Australia.

The awards were not presented in 1998.

Judging
The winners of most of the prizes and awards are decided by a judging panel, with no input from Create NSW (former Arts NSW) or the New South Wales Government. The names of each year's judges are not announced until the final winners are decided. The judging has been the subject of controversy in the past, when in 2010, the panel decided not to bestow the Play Award on any of the applicants.

In November 2011, the NSW Government announced a review of the Premier's Literary Awards for 2012. An independent panel, chaired by journalist Gerard Henderson, reviewed both the Literary and the Premier's History Awards, focussed on the governance, selection criteria and judging processes.  Following the review, the Awards are managed by the State Library of NSW, in association with Create NSW.

Categories
The following prizes and awards are currently given in the New South Wales Premier's Literary Awards.

Christina Stead Prize for Fiction
Douglas Stewart Prize for Non-Fiction
Kenneth Slessor Prize for Poetry
Ethel Turner Prize for Young People's Literature
Patricia Wrightson Prize for Children's Literature
NSW Multicultural Award (formerly Ethnic Affairs Commission Award, Community Relations Commission Award)
UTS Glenda Adams Award for New Writing
Nick Enright Prize for Playwriting (formerly the Play Award)
Script Writing Award (formerly the separate Film, Television and Radio Writing Awards)
NSW Premier's Prize for Literary Scholarship
People's Choice Award
Special Award
NSW Premier's Translation Prize
Multicultural NSW Early Career Translator Prize
Indigenous Writers Prize
Gleebooks Prize (currently inactive)

Christina Stead Prize for Fiction
The Christina Stead Prize is awarded for a work of fiction that may be either a novel or a collection of stories. The recipient receives a A$40,000 prize . It is named in honour of Christina Stead,  an Australian novelist and short-story writer. The first recipient was David Malouf, who was awarded the Prize for his novella An Imaginary Life in 1979. In 2019 Michelle de Kretser won with The Life to Come and equalled Peter Carey's record of three wins.

Award winners

Douglas Stewart Prize for Non-Fiction
The Douglas Stewart Prize is awarded for a prose work that is not fiction. The recipient receives a A$40,000 prize . It is named in honour of Douglas Stewart, a noted Australian literary editor. The first recipient was Manning Clark, who was awarded the Prize for the fourth volume in his series A History of Australia in 1979.  Drusilla Modjeska, with three wins, has won the Prize more than any other individual. In 2019 Billy Griffiths and Sarah Krasnostein were joint winners.

Award winners

Kenneth Slessor Prize for Poetry

The Kenneth Slessor Prize is awarded for a book of poetry, whether collected poems or a single poem of some length, and was first awarded in 1980. The recipient receives a A$30,000 prize . It is named in honour of Kenneth Slessor, a noted Australian poet and journalist. The first recipient was David Campbell, who won the Prize posthumously. In 2011, NSW poet Jennifer Maiden became the only individual to win the award three times. The latest recipient was Peter Boyle in 2020.

Award winners

Ethel Turner Prize for Young People's Literature
The Ethel Turner Prize is awarded for work of fiction, non-fiction or poetry written for young people of secondary school level. The recipient receives a A$30,000 prize . It is named in honour of Ethel Turner, author of the children's classic, Seven Little Australians.

The Children's Literature section of the Premier's Literary Awards began as a single award in 1979, but was redefined in 1999 to create the Patricia Wrightson Prize (for writing for a primary school audience) and the Ethel Turner Prize (for a secondary school audience).  The Ethel Turner Award was also given to all previous winners in the Children's Literature section. The Prize was first won, jointly, by Patricia Wrightson and Jenny Wagner in 1979. The most recent recipients are James Roy and Noël Zihabamwe for their co-authored novel One Thousand Hills. Australian author Ursula Dubosarsky and writer Jaclyn Moriarty have each won the prize three times.

Award winners

Patricia Wrightson Prize for Children's Literature
The Patricia Wrightson Prize is awarded for work of fiction, non-fiction or poetry written for children up to secondary school level. The recipient receives a A$30,000 prize .

The Children's Literature section of the Premier's Literary Awards began as a single award in 1979, but was redefined in 1999 to create the Patricia Wrightson Prize (for writing for a primary school audience) and the Ethel Turner Prize (for a secondary school audience). The Patricia Wrightson Prize was created in honour of children's author Patricia Wrightson, who won the first Ethel Turner Prize in 1979. The first recipient was Odo Hirsch, for his debut children's book, Antonio S and the Mystery of Theodore Guzman. The most recent recipient is Leanne Hall, author of Iris and the Tiger. Kierin Meehan is the only author who has won the Prize more than once.

Award winners

NSW Multicultural Award
This Award was first established in 1980, when it was known as the Ethnic Affairs Commission Award. Later known as the Community Relations Commission Award, and from 2012 referred to as the Community Relations Commission for Multicultural NSW Award, or from 2014 just Multicultural NSW Award, the prize money is worth A$20,000 .

It is offered for: "a book of fiction or non-fiction, memoir or history; a play, musical drama or comedy, theatrical monologue or other theatrical performance; a book of collected poems or a single poem of substantial length published in book form; the screenplay of a feature or documentary film or episode of a television program...; or the script of a radio play or documentary which is deemed by the judges to have made a significant contribution to Australian literature, poetry, theatre, film, radio or television and which also considers any aspect of the Australian migration experience; and/or aspects of cultural diversity and multiculturalism in Australian society."

Award winners

UTS Glenda Adams Award for New Writing

The UTS Glenda Adams Award for New Writing (originally the UTS Award for New Writing) is given for a published book of fiction by an author who has not previously published a work of fiction that is book-length. It was established in 2005, and the winner receives a  prize . from the University of Technology, Sydney.

The award was renamed in 2008 to honour Glenda Adams, the Australian novelist and short story writer who died in 2007.

Award winners

Nick Enright Prize for Playwriting
The Play Award, established in 1983, is given to a play or musical which has been produced in Australia. The winner is chosen based purely on the merit of the written text, and they receive a A$30,000 prize . The award was first given to playwright Nicholas Enright and composer Terence Clarke for the musical Variations.  Writers Daniel Keene and Stephen Sewell have each won the Award three times.

In 2010, the judges decided not to shortlist any plays for the Award, instead bestowing a $30,000 grant for new playwrights. Their decision was widely criticised by many of Australia's most experienced playwrights. Gil Appleton, head of the judging panel, called for all future judges to see a performance of the play rather than judging the work on the script alone.

Award winners

Betty Roland Prize for Script Writing
In 1984, the Film Writing Award and the Television Writing Award were established, followed by the Radio Writing Award in 1988. In 1990, these three awards were amalgamated into the Script Writing Award. It is given for the script of a film, radio program or television program, which may be fiction or a documentary. The winner is chosen based purely on the merit of the written text, and they receive a A$30,000 prize . The award was first given jointly to the film scripts for Sweetie and An Angel at My Table. Directors Jane Campion and Rolf de Heer have each won the Award twice.

Award winners

NSW Premier's Prize for Literary Scholarship
Awarded biennially, the Prize for Literary Scholarship was made to a book, CD-ROM or DVD which presents an original perspective on one or more published works. The winner received a A$30,000 prize. It was discontinued and has not been awarded since 2010.

Award winners

People's Choice Award
This award was established in 2009 to commemorate the 30th anniversary of the awards. The Award is based on votes by New South Wales residents from the works shortlisted for the Christina Stead Prize for fiction. The award was first won by Steve Toltz for his novel, A Fraction of the Whole.

Award winners

Book of the Year
The winner of the New South Wales Book of the Year is chosen from among the winners of that year's awards, with the award worth an extra A$10,000 .

Award winners

Special Award
The Special Award can be proposed by the judges for a work that doesn't easily fit into the existing prizes, or as a general recognition of a writer's achievements. The winner received a A$10,000 prize .

Award winners

NSW Premier's Translation Prize
Awarded biennially, the Translation Prize is offered to Australian translators who translate works into English from other languages. The winner receives a A$30,000 prize . It will next be awarded in 2023.

Award winners

Multicultural NSW Early Career Translator Prize 
The Multicultural NSW Early Career Translator Prize was established in 2015. It is sponsored by Multicultural NSW and the winner currently receives a A$5,000 prize. The award acknowledges translators in the first ten years of their practice.

Award winners

Indigenous Writers' Prize
The inaugural Indigenous Writers' Prize was awarded in 2016. The prize is offered biennially and the winner receives a A$30,000 prize. The prize is intended to acknowledge the contribution made to Australian literary culture by Aboriginal and Torres Strait Islander writers. The first award was shared by joint winners, Bruce Pascoe for his book Dark Emu and Ellen van Neerven for Heat and Light.

Award winners

Gleebooks Prize for Critical Writing
The Gleebooks Prize was established in 1995 and was offered for Australian critical writing. The winner received a A$10,000 prize. It was last awarded in 2009 to David Love and its current status is unknown.

Award winners

See also

 New South Wales Premier's History Awards
List of Australian literary awards

References

External links
 ArtsNSW – NSW Premier’s Literary Awards
 The NSW Premier’s Literary Awards & NSW Premier’s History Awards

Australian fiction awards
Awards established in 1979
Australian non-fiction book awards
Australian theatre awards